RM1 or variant, may refer to:

 RM1, the postcode for a part of Romford, see RM postcode area
 RM1 (Recife Model 1), a quantum computational method of calculating molecular electronic structure, a variant of Austin Model 1
 Valmet RM 1, a class of two-bogie four-axle tram, see List of Valmet products
 RocketMotorOne (RM1), a Tier-1 rocket engine for SpaceShipOne
 RM1, a cancelled space station Russian Research Module
 RM1, a type of railcar in the NZR RM class

See also
 RM (disambiguation)
 RMI (disambiguation)
 IRM (disambiguation)
 1RM